The Nemastomatidae are a family of harvestmen with about 170 described species in 16 recent genera. Several fossil species and genera are known.

Unlike some related currently recognized families, the Nemastomatidae are monophyletic.

Description
Members of the Nemastomatidae range in body length from about one to almost six millimeters. Their chelicerae are of normal proportions, but the pedipalps are very elongated and thin in some groups. Leg length is likewise variable.

Distribution
The subfamily Ortholasmatinae (ten species in two genera) occur on both sides of the Pacific Ocean: in western North America from Mexico to British Columbia and eastern Asia (Japan and northern Thailand.
The other subfamily, Nemastomatinae, occur all over Europe up to Iceland and the Caucasus, in the Atlas Mountains of North Africa, from Anatolia to northern Iran, with a few species found outside this region, in Central Asia and the Himalayas.
Most species are restricted to very small mountainous southern regions.

Relationships
The Nemastomatidae are probably a sister group to the genera Dicranolasma (Dicranolasmatidae) and Trogulus (Trogulidae).

Name
The genus name Nemastoma is a combination of Ancient Greek nema "thread" and stoma "mouth", referring to the elongated pedipalps.

Species

Subfamily Nemastomatinae
 Buresiolla Kratochvíl & Miller, 1958
 Buresiolla bureschi (Roewer, 1926)
 Buresiolla abchasica Ljovuschkin & Starobogatov, 1963 — Abkhazia
 Buresiolla caecum (Nowikoff, 1931) — Crimea
 Nemaspela Silhavý, 1966
 Nemaspela sokolovi (Ljovuschkin & Starobogatov, 1963)
 Nemaspela birsteini Levushkii, 1972
 Nemaspela taurica (Lebedinskiy, 1914) — Crimea
 Giljarovia Kratochvíl & Miller, 1958
 Giljarovia rossica Kratochvíl & Miller, 1958
 Giljarovia stridula (Kratochvíl & Miller, 1958)
 Giljarovia turcica Gruber, 1976
 Nemastoma C. L. Koch, in Hahn & C. L. Koch 1836
 subgenus Nemastoma
 Nemastoma aeginum Roewer, 1951
 Nemastoma amulleri Roewer, 1951
 Nemastoma anatolicum Roewer, 1962
 Nemastoma armeniacum Roewer, 1951
 Nemastoma atticum Roewer, 1927
 Nemastoma bacilliferum Simon, 1879 — Spain
 Nemastoma bacilliferum bacilliferum Simon, 1879 — Pyrenees
 Nemastoma bacilliferum simoni Roewer, 1914
 Nemastoma bacilliferum simplex Simon, 1913
 Nemastoma bacilliferum dipentatum Rambla, 1959
 Nemastoma bidentatum Roewer, 1914 — central Europe
 Nemastoma bidentatum bidentatum Roewer, 1914
 Nemastoma bidentatum sparsum Gruber & Martens, 1968
 Nemastoma bidentatum relictum Gruber & Martens, 1968
 Nemastoma bimaculosum Roewer, 1951
 Nemastoma brevipalpatum Roewer, 1951
 Nemastoma caecum Grese, 1911 — Crimea
 Nemastoma cancellatum Roewer, 1917 — Bosnia
 Nemastoma caporiaccoi Roewer, 1951
 Nemastoma carbonarium Simon, 1907 — Spain
 Nemastoma carpathicum Roewer, 1951 
 † Nemastoma clavigerum Menge, 1854 — fossil
 Nemastoma corcyraeum Roewer, 1917 — Korfu
 Nemastoma cypricum Roewer, 1951 
 † Nemastoma denticulatum Koch & Berendt, 1854 — Baltic amber fossil: Oligocene
 Nemastoma dentigerum Canestrini, 1873 — Italy
 Nemastoma dubium Mello-Leitão, 1936 — Spain
 Nemastoma emigratum Roewer, 1959 
 Nemastoma ferkeri Roewer, 1951 
 Nemastoma filipes Roewer, 1917 — Transcaucasus
 Nemastoma formosum Roewer, 1951 
 Nemastoma franzi Kraus, 1959
 Nemastoma funebre Redikorzev, 1936 — Russia
 Nemastoma gallwitzi Roewer, 1923 — Serbia
 Nemastoma gigas Sørensen, in Lendl 1894 — Hungary
 Nemastoma globuliferum L. Koch, 1867
 Nemastoma gostivarense Hadzi, 1973
 Nemastoma gracile Redikorzev, 1936 — Russia
 Nemastoma hankiewiczii Kulczynski, 1909 — Portugal
 Nemastoma hermanni Kraus, 1959
 Nemastoma ikarium Roewer, 1951 
 Nemastoma insulare Roewer, 1951 
 Nemastoma ios Roewer, 1917 — Sporaden
 Nemastoma kastneri Roewer, 1951
 Nemastoma lessinensis Caporiacco, 1940 — Italy
 Nemastoma leiobunum Wankel, 1851
 Nemastoma lilliputanum (H. Lucas, 1847) — Algeria
 Nemastoma lindbergi Roewer, 1959 
 Nemastoma longipalpatum Roewer, 1951 
 Nemastoma longipes Schenkel, 1947 — Albania
 Nemastoma maarebense Simon, 1913 — Algeria
 Nemastoma machadoi Roewer, 1951 
 Nemastoma mackenseni Roewer, 1923 — Serbia
 Nemastoma macedonicum Hadzi, 1973
 Nemastoma manicatum Simon, 1913 — Spain
 Nemastoma moesiacum Roewer, 1917 — Serbia and Bosnia
 Nemastoma monchiquense Kraus, 1961
 Nemastoma montenegrinum Nosek, 1904 — Montenegro
 Nemastoma navarrense Roewer, 1951 
 Nemastoma nervosum Roewer, 1923 — Serbia
 Nemastoma perfugium Roewer, 1951 
 Nemastoma polonicum Roewer, 1951 
 Nemastoma pyrenaeum Simon, 1879 — Pyrenees
 Nemastoma reimoseri Roewer, 1951 
 Nemastoma rhinoceros Roewer, 1917 — Spain
 Nemastoma riparium Roewer, 1951 
 Nemastoma romanium Roewer, 1951 
 Nemastoma rude Simon, 1881 — Alps
 Nemastoma santorinum Roewer, 1951 
 Nemastoma scabriculum Simon, 1879 — Pyrenees
 Nemastoma schenkeli Roewer, 1951 
 Nemastoma schuelleri Gruber & Martens, 1968 
 Nemastoma senussium Roewer, 1951 
 Nemastoma sexmucronatum Simon, 1911 — Spain
 Nemastoma simplex Giltay, 1933 — Balkans
 Nemastoma spinosissima Kraus, 1961
 Nemastoma spinulosum L. Koch, 1869 — Greece
 Nemastoma strasseri Roewer, 1951 
 Nemastoma stussineri Simon, 1885 — Greece
 † Nemastoma succineum Roewer, 1939  — fossil: Baltic amber 
 Nemastoma tenebricosum Redikorzev, 1936 — Russia
 Nemastoma tenue Hadzi, 1973
 Nemastoma titaniacum Roewer, 1914 — Bosnia
 Nemastoma transsylvanicum Gruber & Martens, 1968 
 Nemastoma triste (C. L. Koch, 1835) — central Europe
 Nemastoma triste triste C. L. Koch in Herrich-Schäffer, 1835
 Nemastoma troglodytes (Wankel, 1861)
 † Nemastoma tuberculatum Koch & Berendt, 1854 — fossil: Oligocene
 Nemastoma tunetanum Roewer, 1951
 Nemastoma vitynae Roewer, 1927 
 subgenus Dromedostoma
 Nemastoma acrospinosum Roewer, 1951 
 Nemastoma acrospinosum acrospinosum Roewer, 1951 
 Nemastoma acrospinosum pretneri Hadzi, 1973
 Nemastoma bipunctatum Hadzi, 1973
 Nemastoma bolei Hadzi, 1973
 Nemastoma corneluttii Hadzi, 1973
 Nemastoma grabovicae Hadzi, 1973
 Nemastoma megarae Hadzi, 1973
 Nemastoma multisignaltum Hadzi, 1973
 Nemastoma nigrum Hadzi, 1973
 Nemastoma radewi Roewer, 1926 — cave in Balkans
 Nemastoma ryla Roewer, 1951
 Nemastoma sketi Hadzi, 1973
 subgenus Lugubrostoma
 Nemastoma boenicum
 Nemastoma goliae Hadzi, 1973
 Nemastoma lugubre (Müller, 1776)
 Nemastoma lugubre lugubre (Müller, 1776)
 Nemastoma lugubre bimaculatum (Fabricius, 1775) — Europe
 Nemastoma lugubre unicolor Roewer, 1914 — southern Europe
 Nemastoma sarae Hadzi, 1973
 Paranemastoma Redikorzew, 1936
 Paranemastoma bicuspidatum (C. L. Koch, 1835)
 Paranemastoma ancae Avram, 1973
 Paranemastoma charitonovi (Mcheidze, 1952)
 Paranemastoma kalischevskyi (Roewer, 1951)
 Paranemastoma kochii (Nowicki, 1870)
 Paranemastoma quadripunctatum (Perty, 1833) — Europe
 Paranemastoma quadripunctatum quadripunctatum (Perty, 1833)
 Paranemastoma quadripunctatum aurosum L. Koch, 1869
 Paranemastoma quadripunctatum armatum Kulczynski, 1909 — southeastern Europe
 Paranemastoma quadripunctatum thessalum Simon, 1885 — Greece
 Paranemastoma quadripunctatum werneri Kulczynski, 1903 — Asia Minor
 Paranemastoma quadripunctatum humerale C. L. Koch, 1839 — southeastern Europe
 Paranemastoma roeweri Starega, 1978
 Paranemastoma sillii (Hermann, 1871) — central Europe
 Paranemastoma suchumium (Roewer, 1951)
 Paranemastoma supersum (Roewer, 1951)
 Paranemastoma umbo (Roewer, 1951)
 Paranemastoma aurigerum (Roewer, 1951) 
 Paranemastoma aurigerum aurigerum Roewer, 1951 
 Paranemastoma aurigerum joannae Starega, 1976
 Histricostoma Kratochvíl & Miller, 1958
 Histricostoma drenskii Kratochvíl & Miller, 1958
 Histricostoma dentipalpe (Ausserer, 1867) — central Europe
 Histricostoma argenteolunulatum (Canestrini, 1872) — Corcica, Italy
 Histricostoma caucasicum (Redikorzev, 1936) — Russia
 Carinostoma Kratochvíl & Miller, 1958
 Carinostoma carinatum (Roewer, 1914) — southeastern Europe
 Carinostoma elegans (Sørensen, 1894) — Hungary
 Carinostoma elegans elegans (Sørensen, 1894)
 Carinostoma elegans batorligetiense (Szalay, 1951)
 Carinostoma ornatum (Hadzi, 1940)
 Centetostoma Kratochvíl & Miller, 1958
 subgenus Centetostoma
 Centetostoma centetes (Simon, 1881) — Alps
 subgenus Cretostoma
 Centetostoma creticum (Roewer, 1927)
 Mitostoma Roewer, 1951
 Mitostoma armatissimum Roewer, 1962 
 Mitostoma daccordii Tedeschi & Sciaky, 1997
 Mitostoma fabianae Tedeschi & Sciaky, 1997
 Mitostoma sabbadinii Tedeschi & Sciaky, 1997
 Mitostoma orghidani Avram, 1969
 Mitostoma dumitrescui Avram, 1969
 Mitostoma patrizii Roewer, 1958
 Mitostoma saxonicum
 Mitostoma asturicum Roewer, 1951
 Mitostoma omalosum Roewer, 1951 
 Mitostoma chrysomelas (Hermann, 1804) — Europe
 Mitostoma chrysomelas chrysomelas (Hermann, 1804)
 Mitostoma chrysomelas michielii Hadzi, 1973
 Mitostoma chrysomelas multidenticulatum Hadzi, 1973
 Mitostoma chrysomelas alpinum Hadzi, 1931 — Yugoslavia
 Mitostoma anophthalmum (Fage, 1946) — Italy
 Mitostoma carneluttii Hadzi, 1973
 Mitostoma helenae Avram, 1970
 Mitostoma macedonicum Hadzi, 1973
 Mitostoma moldavica Avram, 1970
 Mitostoma rodnae Avram, 1970
 Mitostoma zmajevicae Hadzi, 1973
 Mitostoma olgae Silhavý, 1946 — Dalmatia, Montenegro
 Mitostoma olgae olgae Silhavý, 1946
 Mitostoma olgae decorum Silhavý, 1946
 Mitostoma olgae kratochvili Silhavý, 1946
 Mitostoma olgae zorae Hadzi, 1973
 Mitostoma valdemonense Marcellino, 1977

Subfamily Ortholasmatinae
 Cladolasma Suzuki, 1963
 Cladolasma ailaoshan Zhang, Zhao & Zhang, 2018 — China
 Cladolasma angka (Schwendinger & Gruber, 1992) — Thailand
 Cladolasma damingshan Zhang & Zhang, 2013 — China
 Cladolasma parvulum Suzuki, 1963 — Japan
 Dendrolasma Banks, 1894
 Dendrolasma mirabile Banks, 1894 — Washington
 Dendrolasma angka P. J. Schwendinger & J. Gruber, 1992 — Thailand
 Dendrolasma dentipalpe W. A. Shear & J. Gruber, 1983 — California
 Dendrolasma parvula (Suzuki, 1963)
 † Halitherses Giribet & Dunlop, 2005
 † Halitherses grimaldii Giribet & Dunlop, 2005 — fossil: Cretaceous (Cenomanian) Burmese amber,
 Ortholasma Banks, 1894
 Ortholasma bolivari (Goodnight & Goodnight, 1942) — Mexico
 Ortholasma coronadense Cockerell, 1916 — Coronados Islands
 Ortholasma levipes W. A. Shear & J. Gruber, 1983 — California
 Ortholasma pictipes Banks, 1911 — California
 Ortholasma rugosum Banks, 1894 — California
 Ortholasma sbordonii Silhavý, 1973

incertae sedis
 Nemastomella Mello-Leitão, 1936
 Nemastomella integripes Mello-Leitão, 1936 — Spain

 Hadzinia Silhavý, 1966
 Hadzinia karamani (Hadzi, 1940)

 Acromitostoma Roewer, 1951 
 Acromitostoma hispanum (Roewer, 1917) — Spain: Granada
 Acromitostoma rhinoceros Roewer, 1951

 Mediostoma Kratochvíl & Miller, 1958
 Mediostoma graecum (Roewer, 1917)
 Mediostoma topolium (Roewer, 1951) 
 Mediostoma pamiricum W. Starega, 1986 — Tajikistan
 Mediostoma ceratocephalum Gruber, 1976

 Pyza Starega, 1976 
 Pyza bosnica (Roewer, 1916)

 † Rhabdotarachnoides Haupt, 1956 — fossil
 † Rhabdotarachnoides simoni Haupt, 1956 — Permian

Footnotes

References
 Joel Hallan's Biology Catalog: Nemastomatidae
 
  (eds.) (2007): Harvestmen - The Biology of Opiliones. Harvard University Press 

Harvestman families